Bradley Scott Jones (born June 26, 1965) is an American former professional ice hockey left winger who played six seasons in the National Hockey League (NHL) between 1987 and 1992 with the Winnipeg Jets, Los Angeles Kings, and Philadelphia Flyers.

Career
Jones was drafted 156th overall in 1984 by the Winnipeg Jets. As well as Winnipeg, he played for the Los Angeles Kings and the Philadelphia Flyers. He played a total of 148 regular-season games, scoring 25 goals and 56 points.

Career statistics

Regular season and playoffs

International

Awards and honors

References

External links
 

1965 births
Living people
American men's ice hockey left wingers
B.C. Icemen players
Binghamton Rangers players
Fort Wayne Komets players
Frankfurt Lions players
HC Ajoie players
Ice hockey players from Michigan
Ilves players
Los Angeles Kings players
Maine Mariners players
Michigan Wolverines men's ice hockey players
Moncton Hawks players
New Haven Nighthawks players
New Haven Senators players
Philadelphia Flyers players
Springfield Indians players
Sportspeople from Sterling Heights, Michigan
Winnipeg Jets (1979–1996) draft picks
Winnipeg Jets (1979–1996) players
AHCA Division I men's ice hockey All-Americans